Emile Duprée (born Emile Goguen on October 20, 1936) is a Canadian retired professional wrestler and promoter. He is also the father of former WWE wrestler René Duprée, and lives in Pointe-du-Chêne, New Brunswick.

Early life
Goguen was born on October 20, 1936 in Shediac, New Brunswick the son of French Immigrants to Gaetan Goguen (1895-1997) an automobile worker and Taryn Goguen (née Davis) (1912-2011) a teacher. Goguen grew up with 4 brothers and 3 sisters. Goguen dropped out of college when an acquaintance introduced him to Vic Butler and Reggie Richard who trained him to become a professional wrestler.

Professional wrestling career
Duprée began training in 1955 with Maritime professional wrestling legends Vic Butler and Reggie Richard. He had always been into weightlifting, but professional wrestling was something Duprée had never gotten into until Butler and Richard told Emile that they saw potential in Emile for a professional wrestling career.

Duprée started in Boston, Massachusetts and began to travel all over the continent and even went on tours to Australia and New Zealand. He has also wrestled for the legendary Canadian wrestling promotion Stampede Wrestling.

Throughout his career he has wrestled many wrestling legends including Killer Kowalski, Dusty Rhodes, and Maritime legend the Cuban Assassin.

Duprée's last name was also spelled "Dupré". His son René wrestles as "Duprée".

Grand Prix Wrestling
In 1977, Duprée began his own small wrestling promotion. This promotion was run all across the Maritimes and as years went on and the promotion grew, he would take the tour to Quebec, Ontario and other places around the Maritimes.

At one time, Grand Prix Wrestling was televised and had major success until World Wrestling Entertainment bought Grand Prix Wrestling from Emile. Notable wrestlers who have wrestled in Grand Prix Wrestling include Edge, Christian, Killer Kowalski, André the Giant, Randy Savage, Lanny Poffo, Harley Race, and Ric Flair.

During the summer of 2008, Emile ran Grand Prix Wrestling. Emile claims that the promotion ended due to heavy traveling costs. The promotion was partnered up with the WWE to bring Maritime wrestling talent into the WWE spotlight. As of May 2013, Emile and his son Rene decided to bring Grand Prix Wrestling back to life. Their most recent show was in April 2017.

References

External links
 Emile Duprée Profile at SLAM! Sports
 

1936 births
Living people
Canadian male professional wrestlers
People from Shediac
Professional wrestlers from New Brunswick
Canadian people of Acadian descent
Stampede Wrestling alumni
20th-century professional wrestlers